State Route 22 (SR 22) is a  south-to-north state highway in the western part of Tennessee, United States. It begins at the Mississippi state line in McNairy County, where the roadway continues as Mississippi Highway 2 (MS 2). It ends at the Kentucky state line in Lake County, when it crosses into the Kentucky Bend, a detached portion of Fulton County, Kentucky.

Route description

McNairy County

SR 22 begins as a primary highway in McNairy County at the Mississippi state line, where the highway continues south as MS 2. The highway travels north as a two-lane highway, passing through the community of Acton before entering the town of Michie and intersecting SR 224. It then passes through town before coming to an intersection with SR 57. SR 22 then leaves Michie and crosses into Hardin County.

Hardin County

SR 22 continues north into the community of Shiloh and becomes concurrent with SR 142, with which it remains concurrent to the community of Hurley, where SR 142 splits off and goes west, while SR 22 turns northeast and enters Shiloh National Military Park. The highway passes through the park before turning north again to run alongside the Tennessee River, which it does so to its junction with U.S. Route 64 (US 64)/SR 69/SR 15 in Crump. In Crump, SR 22 turns west to become concurrent with US 64/SR 69/SR 15, with SR 69 splitting off to the north about a half mile later. US 64/SR 15/SR 22 continue west, as a four-lane  undivided highway, and cross back into McNairy County.

McNairy County

The roadway almost immediately enters the town of Adamsville and comes to an intersection with SR 117, where SR 22 leaves US 64/SR 15 and turns north again, once again as a two-lane highway, and passes through the community of Mud Creek before becoming concurrent with SR 69 for a second time just south of Milledgeville. They then enter Milledgeville and come to the southern terminus of SR 22's alternate route, SR 22A. Here, SR 22A turns west while SR 69 turns east and leaves SR 22, leaving SR 22 to continue north alone and cross into Chester County.

Chester County

Continuing north, from here SR 22 crosses over Short Branch, then Dry Branch, before passing through farmland and countryside before having an intersection with SR 201 before crossing into Henderson County.

Henderson County

SR 22 then continuing through countryside to a junction with SR 100. It continues north through mostly wooded areas before entering Lexington and widening to an undivided four-lane highway, just before meeting the northern terminus of SR 22A. The highway then crosses the Beech River to enter a small business district before entering downtown and becoming concurrent with SR 104 for a short distance before coming to an intersection with US 412/SR 20, where it splits off to go east on that route. SR 22 continues north, passing through some neighborhoods before leaving Lexington and crossing the Big Sandy River to enter the countryside. It then crosses both Big Beaver Creek and Little Beaver Creek before entering Parkers Crossroads and having an interchange with Interstate 40 (I-40; Exit 108). SR 22 then passes by a few businesses and a city park before leaving Parkers Crossroads and crossing into Carroll County.

Carroll County

SR 22 immediately becomes a divided highway and passes through a wooded area before entering Clarksburg and becoming undivided once again. It has a short concurrency with SR 424 through town before leaving Clarksburg and becoming divided once again. SR 22 then passes through the communities of Anark and Davis Chapel before entering Huntingdon and coming to an interchange and becoming concurrent with US 70/SR 364, turning west to come to an intersection with SR 22 Business, which follows SR 22's old route through downtown. The highway then narrows to two lanes and curves around to an intersection with US 70 Business/SR 1, where US 70 Bus and SR 364 both end and US 70/SR 1 continue southeast, leaving SSR 22 to continue east to an intersection with US 70A/SR 77, where it turns north to become concurrent with that route. They then curve to the northeast before meeting the northern end of SR 22 Bus, where SR 22 leaves US 70A/SR 77 and continues north on its own alignment as a four-lane divided highway, leaving Huntington. The highway goes through countryside again, passing by the Carroll County Airport, before entering McKenzie and having an intersection with SR 124. SR 22 then has junction with SR 423 just before a major interchange with US 79/SR 76, just before crossing into Henry County.

Henry County

SR 22 passes through some neighborhoods before having junction with SR 140. It then passes through some more neighborhoods before crossing into Weakley County.

Weakley County

SR 22 passes through yet another neighborhood before leaving McKenzie and becoming divided once more. It then passes through the town of Gleason and has an intersection with SR 190. It then passes through farmland and passes by the Tater Town Raceway before becoming undivided and entering Dresden by crossing the Middle Fork of the Obion River. It first has an intersection with SR 217 before going through an industrial area and business district before having an intersection with SR 54 just south of downtown. SR 22 then has intersections with SR 89 and SR 239 before leaving Dresden and divided again. It then passes through farmland again before entering Martin at an interchange with the US 45E/SR 216 freeway, where SR 22 turns north to be concurrent with the freeway via flyover ramps while the roadway continues into downtown as SR 431 (Old SR 22). They have an interchange with Industrial Park Drive before coming to the northern end of US 45E Business, where US 45E splits off to go north and SR 22 continues alone along the freeway. It then has two more interchanges, at SR 43 and SR 431 (Old SR 22), before leaving Martin and going northwest. It then has an interchange at Terrell Road before crossing the Obion River into Obion County.

Obion County

SR 22 immediately enters Union City and has another interchange with SR 431 (Old SR 22); it then has an interchange with Tyson Drive before coming to an interchange with US 45W/SR 184 and SR 214, the final interchange before the freeway comes to an end at an interchange with US 51/SR 3. SR 22 is concurrent with US 45W between these final two interchanges. SR 22 then merges on to become concurrent with US 51/SR 3 south, completely bypassing downtown to the north as a four-lane divided highway. They then have an intersection with SR 21 before curving to the south and coming to an intersection with SR 5, where SR 22 turns east to become concurrent with that route as a four-lane undivided highway. SR 22/SR 5 then pass by some businesses and a future interchange with I-69 (under construction) before narrowing to two lanes and coming to a "Y" intersection where SR 22 and SR 5 split, with SR 22 turning northwest to leave Union City as a two-lane Highway. SR 22 then turns predominantly west and passes through farmland and the community of Dixie before winding around to an intersection with SR 157. It then turns southwest and passes between two hills before entering Samburg. The highway passes through downtown before running along the shores of Reelfoot Lake and coming to a "Y" intersection with SR 21 to become concurrent with that highway. They then leave Samburg and continue along the banks of the lake to cross the Hill–Talley Bridge over the Obion River to cross into Lake County.

Lake County

SR 21 and SR 22 continue along the banks of the lake and pass through Reelfoot Lake State Park before turning west, away from the lake, and enter Tiptonville. They pass by some houses before coming to an intersection with SR 78, where SR 22 splits from SR 21 and has a short concurrency with SR 78 before following a new bypass of downtown, and SR 22 downgrades to a secondary highway. Until recently, SR 22 followed SR 21 to enter downtown and came to an intersection where they split, with SR 21 following Church Street west to the Mississippi River, while SR 22 followed Cedar Street. SR 22 turns north again to leave Tiptonville. The highway then passes through farmland and has an intersection with SR 212 before making a series meandering left and right turns before coming to the Kentucky state line, where the road continues north as Kentucky Bend Road into the Kentucky Bend.

Major intersections

Related routes

Alternate route

State Route 22A (SR 22A) is a  alternate route of SR 22 that exists in the west-central part of Tennessee, United States. Its routing takes it through parts of McNairy, Chester, and Henderson counties. SR 22 is one of only three highways in the state to have signed alternate routes that still exist.

SR 22A begins in Milledgeville, at an intersection with the SR 22 mainline and SR 69, in McNairy County. The highway travels due west for one block and curves to the northwest and enters Chester County. Just on the outer city limits of Milledgeville, SR 22A curves to a western routing and enters Enville. There, it intersects the northern terminus of SR 224 (Leapwood Road) and curves to the north-northwest. After a slight jog to the west, it resumes its north-northwesterly routing and leaves town. SR 22A travels through rural areas of the county and enters Jacks Creek, where it intersects SR 100. The alternate route then curves to the north-northeast and enters Henderson County. It eventually enters Lexington, where it intersects the northern terminus of SR 200 and curves to a due-east routing and meets its northern terminus, an intersection with the SR 22 mainline in the extreme southern part of the city.

SR 22A is not part of the National Highway System, a system of roadways important to the nation's economy, defense, and mobility.

Huntingdon business loop

State Route 22 Business (SR 22 Bus.) is a  business route of SR 22 in Huntingdon, Tennessee.

It begins at an intersection with US 70/SR 22/SR 364 south of downtown and heads north into downtown and intersects US 70 Bus./SR 1 in downtown and proceeds northward and comes to an end at SR 22 and US 70A/SR 77 north of downtown.

Interstate 169

The SR 22 freeway section from Martin to Union City is proposed to be Interstate 169 (I-169), a 15 mile auxiliary route of I-69.

See also

 List of highways numbered 22

References

 Tennessee Department of Transportation (24 January 2003). "State Highway and Interstate List 2003".

External links

 Interstate 169 on Interstate-guide.com
 Tennessee State Route 22
 3-digit Interstates from I-69

169 Tennessee
022
Transportation in McNairy County, Tennessee
Transportation in Hardin County, Tennessee
Transportation in Chester County, Tennessee
Transportation in Henderson County, Tennessee
Transportation in Carroll County, Tennessee
Henry
Transportation in Weakley County, Tennessee
Transportation in Obion County, Tennessee
Transportation in Lake County, Tennessee
Freeways in Tennessee